Corrado Böhm (17 January 1923 – 23 October 2017) was a Professor Emeritus at the University of Rome "La Sapienza" and a computer scientist known especially for his contributions to the theory of structured programming, constructive mathematics, combinatory logic, lambda calculus, and the semantics and implementation of functional programming languages.

Work
In his PhD dissertation (in Mathematics, at ETH Zurich, 1951; published in 1954), Böhm describes for the first time a full meta-circular compiler, that is a translation mechanism of a programming language, written in that same language. His most influential contribution is the so-called structured program theorem, published in 1966 together with Giuseppe Jacopini. Together with Alessandro Berarducci, he demonstrated an isomorphism between the strictly-positive algebraic data types and the polymorphic lambda-terms, otherwise known as Böhm–Berarducci encoding.

In the lambda calculus, he established an important separation theorem between normal forms, known as Böhm's theorem, which states that for every two closed λ-terms T1 and T2 which have different βη-normal forms, there exists a term Δ where Δ T1 and Δ T2 evaluate to different free variables (i.e., they may be taken apart internally). This means that, for normalizing terms, Morris' contextual equivalence, which is a semantic property, may be decided through equality of normal forms, a syntactic property, as it coincides with βη-equality.

A special issue of Theoretical Computer Science was dedicated to him in 1993, on his 70th birthday. He is the recipient of the 2001 EATCS Award for a distinguished career in theoretical computer science.

Selected publications
 C. Böhm, "Calculatrices digitales. Du déchiffrage des formules mathématiques par la machine même dans la conception du programme", Annali di Mat. pura e applicata, serie IV, tomo XXXVII, 1–51, 1954. PDF at ETH Zürich English translation 2016 by Peter Sestoft
 C. Böhm, "On a family of Turing machines and the related programming language", ICC Bull., 3, 185–194, July 1964.
 Introduced P′′, the first imperative language without GOTO to be proved Turing-complete.
 C. Böhm, G. Jacopini, "Flow diagrams, Turing Machines and Languages with only Two Formation Rules", Comm. of the ACM, 9(5): 366–371,1966.
 C. Böhm, "Alcune proprietà delle forme β-η-normali nel λ-K-calcolo", Pubbl. INAC, n. 696, Roma, 1968.
 C. Böhm, A. Berarducci, "Automatic Synthesis of typed Lambda-programs on Term Algebras", Theoretical Computer Science, 39: 135–154, 1985.
 C. Böhm, "Functional Programming and Combinatory algebras", MFCS, Carlsbad, Czechoslovakia, eds M.P. Chytil, L. Janiga and V. Koubek, LNCS 324, 14–26, 1988.

See also
 P′′, a minimal computer programming language
 Structured program theorem
 List of pioneers in computer science
 Böhm tree
 Böhm's theorem

References

 Vitae (University of Rome)

External links

 "A Collection of Contributions in Honour of Corrado Böhm on the Occasion of his 70th Birthday", Theoretical Computer Science, Volume 121, Numbers 1&2, 1993.
 Corrado Böhm's personal page.

1923 births
2017 deaths
Italian computer scientists
Academic staff of the Sapienza University of Rome
Italian people of German descent
École Polytechnique Fédérale de Lausanne alumni
20th-century Italian scientists
21st-century Italian scientists
Scientists from Milan